Sam Kennedy may refer to:

Fictional characters

 Sam Kennedy (Holby City)
 Sam Kennedy (Home and Away)

Sportspeople
 Sam Kennedy (American football) (born 1964), former American football linebacker
 Sam Kennedy (footballer, born 1881) (1881–1955), Scottish international footballer
 Sam Kennedy (footballer, born 1896) (1896–1963), English footballer
 Sam Kennedy (footballer, born 1899) (1899–?), Scottish footballer

Others
 Sam Kennedy (baseball executive) (born 1973), president of the Boston Red Sox of Major League Baseball
 Sam Kennedy, an alias of tax protester Glenn Unger (born 1951)